Ferndale is the name of several places:

In Canada:

Ferndale, British Columbia 
Ferndale, Bruce County, Ontario
Ferndale, Muskoka District Municipality, Ontario
Ferndale, Peel Regional Municipality, Ontario

In the United States:

 Ferndale, California
 Ferndale, Florida
 Ferndale, Indiana
Ferndale, Kentucky
 Ferndale, Maryland
Ferndale (Baltimore Light Rail station), Baltimore, Maryland
 Ferndale, Michigan
 Ferndale, New York
 Ferndale, Oregon
 Ferndale, Pennsylvania
 Ferndale, Washington

In Australia:

 Ferndale, Western Australia
 Ferndale, New South Wales
 Ferndale, Victoria (small rural locality in Strezlecki Ranges south of Warragul)
Ferndale Park, New South Wales
Ferndale Park, Victoria

In New Zealand:
Ferndale, Taranaki, a suburb of New Plymouth
A fictitious Auckland suburb in which the TVNZ soap opera Shortland Street takes place

In other countries:

Ferndale (Lambeth ward), an electoral ward in Brixton and Clapham, London, England
Ferndale, Rhondda Cynon Taf, Wales, United Kingdom
Ferndale, Western Cape, Brackenfell, South Africa 
Ferndale, South Africa, Randburg, South Africa

See also
 Fairview-Ferndale, Pennsylvania